HighFleet, styled as HighFleet: Deus in Nobis (Latin for "God within us") is an action-adventure strategy video game developed by Konstantin Koshutin and published by MicroProse. The game involves the player commanding a fleet of metal airships in a dieselpunk post-apocalyptic future Earth in an attempt to seize a rebellious region rumored to have access to a nuclear reactor.

Setting 
HighFleet takes place in a Dune-inspired post-apocalyptic future where humanity has returned to feudal-style governments on a ravaged planet Earth, known contemporarily as Elaat, following an event known as The Catastrophe. The Catastrophe was believed to have occurred thousands of years before the events of the game, when humanity blew up the Moon (called Kharu by historians of the Romani Empire) with nuclear weapons, causing it to shatter and impact the Earth, destroying the climate and wiping out all traces of advanced technology and artificial intelligence. Due to The Catastrophe, the predominant form of combat in the world of Elaat is performed with large metal airships powered by methane, with political tides being determined by naval strength.

The events of HighFleet take place 214 years after the founding of the Romani Empire, the most powerful nation in the known world, led by the House of Sayadi. The Empire, though once prosperous, is on the verge of defeat by the Gathering of Great Houses, a military alliance from the desert region of Gerat. Gerati leaders, led by the Lord-Governor of the city of Khiva, rebelled against the Empire after decades of peace and overthrew the Imperial puppet king Elaou-Ali, declaring themselves the Republic of Gerat.

The setting of Gerat is based on the Middle East and Central Asia, with the Gathering War and the circumstances around it being heavily inspired by the Soviet-Afghan war. The land of Gerat is split between two major ethnic groups, the Romani and Elaim. The Romani are from the core of the Empire, located to the south of Gerat, and are often at odds with the native Elaim. The conflict between the Imperial and Gerati cultures features prominently throughout the game and has the chance to affect major plot elements.

Plot 
214 years after the founding of the Romani Empire, the Empire is on the verge of defeat by the Gathering of Great Houses, and the House of Sayadi is in danger of being exterminated. The player, heir to the Imperial throne Grand Duke Mark Sayadi Salemsky, along with Fleet Admiral Sharif Rahmatovich Daud and General Pyotr Ignatyevich Shahin, is on an expeditionary mission to the rebellious Republic of Gerat in an attempt to cut off the Gathering's fleet and secure the rumored nuclear reactor believed to be located in the city of Khiva, one of only three to survive The Catastrophe.

Shortly before the campaign reaches Gerat, the Imperial flagship Sevastopol arrives unexpectedly, and brings grave news about the state of the war. According to Pyotr, the capital of the Empire, long under siege from the Gathering's fleet, has been hit with a devastating and unprecedented nuclear strike, and the current Emperor, Kerim Shah II, is assumed to be dead. After much deliberation, Pyotr convinces the fleet to continue the campaign to Khiva as a last-ditch effort in hopes of forcing the Gathering of Great Houses to accept a peace deal. The expeditionary force crowns the Grand Duke the new Emperor of the Romani Empire and Grand Tarkhan of the Fleet before setting off towards Gerat. Before the fleet's departure, the Grand Duke and his assistants decide to send the strategic cruiser Diana back to the Empire in hopes of establishing contact with any survivors.

As the Fleet begins to push deeper into Gerat, they make contact with a variety of Tarkhans, military leaders in hiding as a result of the Gathering War. Depending on player choices, the Fleet recruits some or all of these Tarkhans to assist with their campaign to Khiva. Eventually, the Grand Duke encounters an aging doyen, a tribal leader, who wishes to show him a Qoda, a scrap of paper from a religious text that survived The Catastrophe. Although the Qodas are written in a forgotten language and deciphering them has proven almost impossible for those in possession of them, the Grand Duke is able to read it without effort. Depending on player choices, the Grand Duke can either claim that the House of Sayadi has preserved this forgotten language, or that it's simply a miracle. If the player chooses to claim it as a miracle, the Grand Duke will be treated like a prophet and will be given additional options that bolster this identity. The Grand Duke can eventually claim that the expedition of Khiva is a religious pilgrimage to secure the city as a "sacred Ark".

Sometime well into the campaign's progress towards Khiva, the Fleet is shocked upon waking up to find that the sun has not risen. Admiral Daud claims it to be a solar eclipse, but Pyotr, who has been monitoring the situation, says that it must be a climatic catastrophe caused by the unbridled nuclear war in the Empire. The native Elaim take it as a fulfillment of their prophecy of the end of the world, and the fleet falls into chaos. The Grand Duke is forced to give a speech to the crew in an attempt to reassure them. If the Grand Duke has been established as a prophet, he can claim that the end of the world is indeed nigh, but his expedition will save humanity. The fleet hurries to Khiva in hopes that the reactor's power will allow Gerat to survive in the endless night.

Before reaching Khiva, the strategic cruiser Diana returns to the expeditionary force with news from the capital. Contrary to the earlier statements by Pyotr, the war in the Empire is much less severe, the capital is intact and still under Imperial control, and the Emperor is alive. Daud accuses Pyotr of lying, claiming that he covered up a message from High Command sent before the expedtion to Khiva ordering the fleet to go back to the capital. Pyotr admits to doing so, but claims that the strategic opportunity to take Khiva was too important. Depending on player choices, Admiral Daud is either shot and killed by Pyotr, or Pyotr is arrested and Daud takes all Imperial forces back to the capital, leaving the Grand Duke with only the Sevastopol and any mercenaries hired throughout the game.

Upon reaching the outskirts of Khiva, the Lord-Governor sends a message to the Grand Duke asking to meet with him alone upon the plains of Basra, located far from the city. Depending on player choices, the Grand Duke will either ignore the request outright, assuming it to be a trap, and fights the Governor's fleet over Khiva, or agrees and goes to meet with him. If the Grand Duke chooses to meet with the Lord-Governor of Khiva, he is given the option to duel him with his flagship Varyag, consistent with Gerati traditions. However, if the Grand Duke has been declared a prophet, he will attempt to convince the Lord-Governor to join him. If successful, the Lord-Governor joins the expeditionary force with his flagship and leaves the fleet of Khiva to fend for themselves.

Upon securing Khiva, the expeditionary force lands in the city and is shocked to discover that the rumors are true; not only is the nuclear reactor real, but so is the supply of weapons-grade plutonium, and as a result, Khiva has become the biggest manufacturing center for advanced nuclear weapons in the world. The Gathering refuses to negotiate and instead performs a suicidal nuclear attack on the city to destroy all traces of its existence, which is successfully fended off by the expeditionary fleet. Following the battle, the Grand Duke, Pyotr and the rest of the expeditionary command inspect the nuclear reactor located in the heart of Khiva. Upon stepping into the reactor control room, the Grand Duke sees a message inscribed on a white stone pillar in the center of the room, and describes it as, "...neat, and very clear." After the scene, the game ends.

Gameplay 
The majority of the gameplay takes place in a top-down view of the strategic map. Here the player may command their fleet, detect enemies with sensors, radio interception, and code-breaking, intercept enemies with missiles and jets, and salvage wreckage. Players must also consider fuel while moving around the map, and the morale of their crew.

When the player fleet engages with an enemy fleet, or when aircraft / missiles engage a target, the game switches to real-time combat resembling "simcade" games (where controls are simple like an arcade game but the gameplay itself is nuanced like a simulation game). Before combat, the player will select ships to directly fight enemy ships. The AI can control up to three ships on screen at a time, and any more will be queued to spawn after the destruction of one onscreen. Meanwhile, the player will only be given one at a time, to make up for the inefficiencies of the AI and the standard ship designs, as well as allow the player to control the ship granularly, having control directly over its movement and aim. When a combat is initiated by a missile or jet, the attacking party cannot control any aspect of the combat except ordering aircraft to disengage. The defender can control ships to defend themselves with whatever they have, or to potentially evade the attack itself.

Ship designs can also be edited in a large variety of ways. Outside of the campaign mode, players may create new ships in the ship editor and test them out before using them in the campaign.

Along with plot development and randomly generated events, the player may meet Tarkhans in cities. Tarkhans allow the player to acquire more ships and gain special assets when appealed to via a diplomacy system. The Tarkhan interactions consist of a set of dialogue options where the player must pick the right choices based on the Tarkhan's interests.

Reception

The game received "mixed or average" reviews on Metacritic. Reviewers praised the immersive interface and combat and the intricacy of systems such as the ship building and intelligence gathering mechanics. However, many also criticized the steep learning curve and, at the time of launch, an inability to change graphical settings, keybindings, or difficulty levels.

Sources

External Links
 Official Website

2021 video games
Dieselpunk video games
Indie video games
MicroProse games
Post-apocalyptic video games
Single-player video games
Strategy video games
Video games developed in Russia
Windows games
Windows-only games